Karl N. Snow Jr. (born July 1, 1930), is a former American politician who was a Republican member of the Utah State Senate and was the senate majority leader from 1981-1982. Snow, a former professor at Brigham Young University, attended BYU (B.S. in Political Science), the University of Minnesota (MS in Public Administration) and the University of Southern California, (Ph.D.). He and his wife Donna have six children and have served in several humanitarian efforts, including an LDS Charities mission to Swaziland and Lesotho that focused on providing Measles immunizations. Currently they reside in Provo, Utah in their retirement.

References

1930 births
Living people
Republican Party Utah state senators